The 8 cm kanon vz. 28 (Cannon model 1928) was a Czech field gun used during World War II.

Design & history
The origins of the 8 cm kanon vz. 28 began in 1928 at the Škoda Works in Pilsen.  The design attempted to combine the field gun, mountain gun, and anti-aircraft gun roles into one weapon.  The vz. 28 combined a two-wheeled box trail carriage, horizontal sliding wedge breech, hydro-pneumatic recoil system, muzzle brake, high angle elevation and a firing table for 360° degree traverse.  For the mountain gun role it could be broken down into three pieces for transport, a feature also shared by the contemporary 10 cm houfnice vz. 28 and the later 8 cm kanon vz. 30 and 10 cm houfnice vz. 30 guns.

The vz. 28 proved to be fairly successful as a field and mountain gun, but was a failure as an anti-aircraft gun due to very quick developments in aviation during the following decade.  The Czech Army used the vz. 28 in limited numbers, but ordered its successor the vz. 30 in larger numbers.  The vz. 30 lacked the vz. 28's firing table, otherwise their configuration, dimensions, and performance were largely the same.

The Yugoslav Army ordered the vz. 28 who referred to it as the 80 mm M.28.  The Romanian Army also ordered a 75 mm version the 75 mm Skoda Model 1928 which it used during World War II.  Guns captured from Yugoslavia by the Germans were given the designation 7.65 cm FK 304(j).

Notes

References
 Peter Chamberlain and Terry Gander: Light and Medium field Artillery. New York. Arco Publishing. 1977.

External links
 https://web.archive.org/web/20071202052427/http://warandgame.wordpress.com/2007/11/21/skoda-765-mm-kanon-vz-30-and-100-mm-houfnice-vz-30/
 http://www.worldwar2.ro/arr/?article=305
 http://www.quarryhs.co.uk/ammotable9.html

World War II artillery of Germany
World War II field artillery
Artillery of Czechoslovakia
76 mm artillery
Military equipment introduced in the 1920s